Santa María de Melque is a church in the province of Toledo in Spain.  It has been described as the biggest fully vaulted early medieval church still standing in Western Europe.
It is located in the municipality of San Martín de Montalbán, equidistant from the towns of La Puebla de Montalbán and Gálvez, between the brook Ripas and the river Torcón, a tributary of the river Tagus.

Of the entire complex, recently restored, the church stands out, exemplary Mozarabic-Visigothic, as the most important religious monument of the Early Middle Ages in Spain.

Currently, the church, which occupies the center of the complex, and the center of interpretation which has been installed in the adjoining rooms, also restored, can be visited. The scenery that is observed from Santa María is also characteristic of the area.

History

There was originally a Roman settlement at the location, with five dams across the two brooks that surround a small, rocky hill. 
Santa María de Melque came into being as a monastic collection inside the Catholic Kingdom of Toledo. 
Construction commenced in the 7th century, coinciding with the end of the Visigothic kingdom. It has been argued that construction came to a halt with the arrival of the Arabs, to be continued later, although there is a counter-argument that the architecture shows Syrian influence (specifically Syro-Umayyad). 
It appears that there was an Islamic settlement at Melche in the 8th century.

With the conquest of Toledo by King Alfonso VI of León and Castile in 1085, the temple recovered its liturgical function without losing its military function. The anthropomorphic tombs located to the east and the remains of barbicans are testimonies of this historic period.

Worship ceased at the site in the 19th century following the Confiscation.

Architecture

It was constructed in 8th century and it's the first one-half monument better preserved of the Spanish High Middle Ages. Its constructive technique is the architecture's direct inheritance late roman.
However, the lack of decorative elements preserved (filigrees of stucco in the transverse arches of the crossing) that still can be seen in the background of the southern arm of the crossing suggests that Melque could be at first a mausoleum, destined to burial of a distinguished personage from Toledo's Visigothic Kingdom. The church was later redesigned on at least two occasions.

The Knights Templar turned the church into defensive tower, like a turris as the Romans used to. This tower over the dome base has been recently dismounted. It had a porch with three openings which no longer exists.

The plant is cruciform, with a central apse: the two lateral apses were added later. It keeps in good condition its different naves, some side chapels and a parlor with very pronounced horseshoe arches. And a niche probably for the founder of the temple.

The presbytery is large correspondingly to a monastic community with Round arches at both sides. Also is preserved a moorish tower over the vault.

It was made with enormous unmortared blocks which look like the Aqueduct of Segovia. The molduration is calculated in Roman cubits, similar to the molduration at San Pedro de la Mata, also in Toledo.

This church has contributions of clearly Visigothic style with new solutions that the mozarabs contribute, and besides memories of the Roman style:
 Visigothic contributions: the horseshoe arch that supports the apse's vault, surpassing 1/3 of the radium. The set unprovided of remains sculptured, of Visigothic tradition. The arcosolium.
 Mozarabic contributions: central horseshoe arches of surpassing 1/2 of the radium. Arches of the windows in 2/3. Strange semicircular pilasters of the inside that neither may be considered semi-detached.
 Innovations: the circular reduction of the corners in its 4 facades and the vertical crack at both sides, having the appearance of pseudo columns. It looks like the columns placed at the corners of the lantern towers of Romanesque Norman style. It's an unprecedented solution.
 Roman style: The enormous granite blocks, the molduration in Roman cubits, its plant is comparable to Mausoleum of Galla Placidia in Ravenna (Italy).

References

External links 

Tourism site
  Photographic journey through the Spanish Visigothic church of St. Mary of Melque.

Visigothic architecture
Mozarabic architecture
Churches in Castilla–La Mancha
Fortified church buildings in Spain
8th-century churches in Spain